"Wish You Well" is a song by English DJ Sigala and English singer Becky Hill, released on 24 May 2019 through Ministry of Sound and B1 Recordings. The single peaked at number eight on the UK Singles Chart, becoming Sigala's seventh UK top 10 and Becky Hill's second top 10 (third overall including her uncredited appearance on "Afterglow" by Wilkinson).

Promotion
Sigala announced the collaboration in a post to social media on 20 May, sharing a 15-second audio clip of the song.

Critical reception
Billboards Kat Bein considered the summer song as "a powerful house pop tune with cascading synths, tension-filled builds and an ecstatic, club-ready release." She also wrote that the song uses elements that were popular earlier in the 2010s decade, presented with a modern sheen and sensibility.

Live performances
Sigala and Hill performed the song on BBC Radio 1's Big Weekend 2019 on 25 May 2019 (the day after the song's release). Sigala and Hill also performed the song together at Capital FM's Summertime Ball 2019 on 8 June 2019 at Wembley Stadium.

Personnel
Credits adapted from Tidal.

 Sigala – instruments, vocal production, production, mix engineering, programming
 Becky Hill – vocal
 Jarly – production
 Kevin Grainger – master engineering, mixing engineering
 Dipesh Parmar – performance arranging
 Milly McGregor – strings
 Andreas Krüger – vocal production
 Ryan Ashley – vocal production

Charts

Weekly charts

Year-end charts

Certifications

References

2019 singles
2019 songs
Sigala songs
Becky Hill songs

Songs written by Sigala
Songs written by Becky Hill
Songs written by Maegan Cottone